The Roter Kogel is a mountain, in the Stubai Alps in the Austrian state of Tyrol.

It lies on a ridge that runs from the Hohe Villerspitze over the Lüsener Villerspitze northwards as far as the Fotscher Windegg. West of this chain lies the Lüsener Valley and the village of Praxmar, a starting point for an ascent of the Roter Kogel. East of the Roter Kogels stretches the valley of Fotscher Tal, where there are two other bases: the Alpengasthof Bergheim Fotsch and the Potsdamer Hut. This ascent up the eastern side is also a popular ski tour in winter.

Literature
Heinrich und Walter Klier, Alpenvereinsführer Stubaier Alpen, Bergverlag Rudolf Rother, München 1988. 

Mountains of Tyrol (state)
Mountains of the Alps
Stubai Alps